Seeland Records is an independent record label created by Negativland in 1979 to release their own recordings. It is a reference to the song "Seeland" by the band Neu!, who also gave Negativland the basis for their name, Sea-Land Corporation, a freight company, (the label's logo is a parody of the company's logo) and the micro-nation of Sealand, which in early history was home to radio pirates.

History
Seeland largely disappeared when Negativland signed with SST Records for a time during the late 1980s and early 1990s.  But after an acrimonious split with that label, Negativland revived Seeland and began releasing new recordings, not just by themselves but also by other artists (the Evolution Control Committee and John Oswald to name two) who usually shared their philosophies regarding fair use. The label was distributed by Lumberjack Mordam Distribution until 2009, when Mordam shut down. Subsequently, the band relaunched the label in 2010 with distribution from Revolver USA.

Roster
 Antediluvian Rocking Horse
 Bob Ostertag
 Eddie The Rat
 Head & Leg
 Jane Timberlake
 John Oswald
 GitAr (I Cut People, Ellipse Elkshow)
 Mono Pause/Aavikko
 Negativland
 PantyChrist (Bob Ostertag, Justin Bond, and Otomo Yoshihide)
 Porest
 Realistic
 Silica-Gel
 Sleepytime Gorilla Museum
 The Evolution Control Committee
 The Rudy Schwartz Project
 Tiny Tim
 Twink
 Xerophonics

See also
 List of record labels

American independent record labels
Experimental music record labels
Re-established companies
1979 establishments in the United States